Seira domestica is a species in the family Entomobryidae ("slender springtails"), in the order Entomobryomorpha ("elongate-bodied springtails").

References

External links

Collembola
Animals described in 1842